W40 may refer to:

Westerhout 40, a nebula and star-forming region in the Milky Way Galaxy, also known as Sh2-64, RCW 174, or LBN 028.77+03.43.
W40 (nuclear warhead)

In athletics:
 Masters athletics, an age group for athletes aged 35+